Operation Konrad was the German-Hungarian effort to relieve the encircled garrison of Budapest during the Battle of Budapest in January 1945. The operation was divided into three parts:

 Operation Konrad I - 1 January 1945 - Led by IV SS Panzer Corps from Tata. Halted near Bicske.
 Operation Konrad II - 7 January 1945 - Led by IV SS Panzer Corps from Esztergom. Halted at Pilisszentkereszt.
 Operation Konrad III - 17 January 1945 - Led by IV SS Panzer Corps and III Panzer Corps from south of Budapest near Székesfehérvár. Attempt to encircle ten Soviet divisions. Halted south of Ercsi.

See also
 1st Panzer Division - Part of relief force
 IV SS Panzer Corps - Part of relief force
 III Panzer Corps - Part of relief force
 IX SS Mountain Corps - Besieged in Budapest
 Hungarian Third Army - Besieged in Budapest

References

External links 

 

Military operations of World War II involving Germany
Battles and operations of the Soviet–German War
Battles involving Hungary